Gösta Otto Runö (9 December 1896 – 13 November 1922) was a Swedish modern pentathlete who won a bronze medal at the 1920 Summer Olympics.

Runö was a military pilot with the rank of lieutenant. In 1922 he crashed his Phönix D III plane near Linköping and died, aged 25.

References

1896 births
1922 deaths
Swedish male modern pentathletes
Olympic modern pentathletes of Sweden
Modern pentathletes at the 1920 Summer Olympics
Olympic bronze medalists for Sweden
Olympic medalists in modern pentathlon
Sportspeople from Stockholm
Victims of aviation accidents or incidents in Sweden
Medalists at the 1920 Summer Olympics
Victims of aviation accidents or incidents in 1922
Swedish Air Force officers